St. Clair County is a county located in the U.S. state of Michigan and bordering the west bank of the St. Clair River. As of the 2020 census, the population was 160,383. It is the 13th-most populous county in the state. The county seat is Port Huron, located at the north end of the St. Clair River at Lake Huron. The county was created September 10, 1820, and its government was organized in 1821. It is located northeast of Detroit. Geographically, it lies in the Thumb area of eastern Michigan.

Etymology
French explorer René-Robert Cavelier, Sieur de La Salle led an expedition to this area on August 12, 1679. English mapmakers adopted the French name, identifying the lake feature as Saint Clare on maps dated as early as 1710. By the Mitchell Map of 1755, the spelling was given as St. Clair, which is the current version. Located along the western shores of Lake St. Clair and the St. Clair River, the county was named for them by European-American settlers.

The name is sometimes mistakenly attributed to honoring Arthur St. Clair, an American Revolutionary War general and governor of the Northwest Territory, but it was established long before he was considered a notable figure. The earlier spelling of the lake's name may have been conflated with English practice and the name of the general, as several political jurisdictions near the lake and the river, such as St. Clair County, St. Clair Township, and the cities of St. Clair and St. Clair Shores, share this spelling (see List of Michigan county name etymologies).

The name has sometimes been mistakenly attributed to honoring Patrick Sinclair, a British officer who purchased land on the St. Clair River at the mouth of the Pine River. In 1764, he built Fort Sinclair there, which was in use for nearly 20 years before being abandoned. As noted, the name was established before he was active in the area.

Geography

St. Clair County is one of five counties that form the peninsula, known as the Thumb, that projects into Lake Huron. St. Clair County is closely connected in terms of economy with its neighbors, Metro Detroit and Sanilac County in Michigan, and Lambton County across the river in Ontario, Canada. Saint Clair County is the principal county in The Blue Water Area, a sub-region of the Thumb.

Adjacent counties
 Sanilac (north)
 Lapeer (west)
 Macomb (south)
 Lambton, Ontario (east)

Major highways
  enters the county from the west, coming from Lansing and Flint, terminating at the approach to the Blue Water Bridge in Port Huron. (Once fully completed, the mainline of I-69 will span from Brownsville, Texas to Port Huron, Michigan.)
  enters St. Clair County from the southwest, having traversed the entire Metro Detroit region, and terminates at the approach to the Blue Water Bridge in Port Huron. On the Canadian side of the border, in Sarnia, Ontario, the route heads easterly, designated as Highway 402.
 
 
 
  follows the Lake Huron–Saginaw Bay shoreline, beginning in Bay City and ending at a junction with |I-94/|I-69, and BL I-94/BL I-69 on the north side of Port Huron.
 
 
  serves Harsens Island, in Lake St. Clair.

Demographics

The 2010 United States census indicates St. Clair County had a 2010 population of 163,040. This is a decrease of -1,195 people from the 2000 United States census. Overall, the county had a -0.7% growth rate during this ten-year period. In 2010 there were 63,841 households and 44,238 families in the county. The population density was 226.1 per square mile (87.3 square kilometers). There were 71,822 housing units at an average density of 99.6 per square mile (38.5 square kilometers). 93.9% were White, 2.4% Black or African American, 0.5% Asian, 0.4% Native American, 0.7% of some other race and 2.0% of two or more races. 2.9% were Hispanic or Latino (of any race). 25.9% identified as of German, 10.2% Polish, 9.3% Irish, 8.5% English, 6.5% French, 6.5% American, and 5.1% Italian ancestry.

There were 63,841 households, out of which 31.3% had children under the age of 18 living with them, 52.9% were opposite-sex families, 11.4% had a female householder with no husband present, 30.7% were non-families, and 25.5% were made up of individuals. The average household size was 2.52 and the average family size was 3.01.

In the county, the population was spread out, with 23.7% under the age of 18, 8.0% from 18 to 24, 23.8% from 25 to 44, 30.1% from 45 to 64, and 14.5% who were 65 years of age or older. The median age was 41 years. For every 100 females, there were 98.1 males. For every 100 females age 18 and over, there were 95.7 males.

The 2010 American Community Survey 1-year estimate indicates the median income for a household in the county was $44,369 and the median income for a family was $53,207. Males had a median income of $30,056 versus $16,771 for females. The per capita income for the county was $22,390. About 10.4% of families and 15.4% of the population were below the poverty line, including 22.7% of those under the age of 18 and 6.8% of those age 65 or over.

Government

The county government operates the jail, maintains rural roads, operates the
major local courts, keeps files of deeds and mortgages, maintains vital records, administers
public health regulations, and participates with the state in the provision of welfare and
other social services. The county board of commissioners controls the
budget but has only limited authority to make laws or ordinances.  In Michigan, most local
government functions — police and fire, building and zoning, tax assessment, street
maintenance, etc. — are the responsibility of individual cities and townships.

Elected officials
 Prosecuting attorney: Michael D. Wendling
 Sheriff: Mat King
 County clerk/register of deeds: Angie Waters
 County treasurer: Kelly Roberts-Burnett
 Drain commissioner: Robert Wiley
 County commissioner, district 1: Steven Simasko
 County commissioner, district 2: Jorja Baldwin
 County commissioner, district 3: Lisa Beedon
 County commissioner, district 4: Joi Torello
 County commissioner, district 5: Jeffrey L. Bohm
 County commissioner, district 6: David Rushing
 County commissioner, district 7: Dave Vandenbossche
 31st Circuit Court: Cynthia Lane, Michael West, Daniel Damman
 72nd District Court: Michael Hulewicz; John Monaghan; Cynthia Platzer
 74th Probate Court: Elwood Brown; John Tomlinson

(information )

Parks
St. Clair County is home to five county parks: Columbus County Park, Fort Gratiot County Park, Fort Gratiot Light station, Goodells County Park, and Woodsong County Park. St. Clair County also operates the Wadhams to Avoca Trail and works with local units of government to develop the Bridge to Bay Trail.

Communities

Cities
 Algonac
 Marine City
 Marysville
 Memphis (partial)
 Port Huron (county seat)
 Richmond (partial)
 St. Clair
 Yale

Villages
 Capac
 Emmett

Charter townships
 China
 East China
 Fort Gratiot
 Port Huron

Civil townships

 Berlin
 Brockway
 Burtchville
 Casco
 Clay
 Clyde
 Columbus
 Cottrellville
 Emmett
 Grant
 Greenwood
 Ira
 Kenockee
 Kimball
 Lynn
 Mussey
 Riley
 St. Clair
 Wales

Census-designated place
 Pearl Beach

Other unincorporated communities

 Abbottsford
 Adair
 Allenton
 Anchorville
 Atkins
 Avoca
 Avalon Beach
 Bedore
 Belle River
 Berville
 Blaine
 Broadbridge Station
 Brockway
 Casco
 Cherry Beach
 Clays Landing
 Columbus
 Copeland Corner
 Fair Haven
 Fargo
 Forster
 Gardendale
 Grande Pointe
 Goodells
 Hawthorne
 Jeddo
 Kimball
 Keewahdin
 Lakeport
 Lambs
 Lesterville
 Maple Leaf
 Martindale Beach
 Miller
 Muirs
 Muttonville
 North Lakeport
 North Street
 Perch Point
 Peters
 Pointe aux Tremble
 Rattle Run
 Riley Center
 Riverside
 Roberts Landing
 Ruby
 Sans Souci
 Smiths Creek
 Snyderville
 South Park
 Sparlingville
 Starville
 Tappan
 Thornton
 Wadhams
 Wales
 West Tappan

See also

 List of Michigan State Historic Sites in St. Clair County
 National Register of Historic Places listings in St. Clair County, Michigan
 Blue Water River Walk

References

References

External links
 St. Clair County
 Info and photos of historic bridges in St. Clair County
 

 
Saint Clair County, Michigan
Metro Detroit
1821 establishments in Michigan Territory
Populated places established in 1821